Crowbone is the fifth and final novel of the Oathsworn series by Scottish writer of historical fiction, Robert Low, released on 13 September 2012 through Harper. Its publication was followed the next day by the author's putting a short (9-page) e-book short story collection on his website as a companion piece: The Untold Tales of Little Crowbone. Due to its brevity, StoryGraph counts the e-book as "#5.5" in the series.

Plot
Unlike the previous four volumes in the Oathsworn series, the story of Crowbone now revolves around 17-year-old Olaf "Crowbone" Tryggvason, already an experienced warrior, but also kin of late King Harald Fairhair and true heir to the throne of Norway. (As a result, the story can be followed without having read the previous four books.) A dying monk passes on a secret which puts Crowbone and the Oathsworn into harsher conflict with his enemies Gunnhild, the Witch Mother of Kings, and her son Gudrod, to determine the kingdom's future.

Critical reception
The book was well received. David Maclaine's review says Crowbone "... takes the reader from stormy shipwreck to pitched battle, all with a feel of vivid reality. Low’s writing continues to impress with its richness and power. His story-telling remains uncompromising in its treatment of the harsh, violent lives of men who earn their fame and fortune with blows of a battle ax." He ranks this and the rest of the Oathsworn series among "the 45 best historical novels set in the Viking Age", and notes that author and historian Harry Sidebottom also called this series "the best of the Viking novels". Historical novelist Carla Nayland's review calls Crowbone "a blood-and-thunder adventure full of action and violence. ... Gripping, violent action-adventure...". Historical novelist Simon ("S.J.A.") Turney writes: "Quite simply, Crowbone is now my favourite Oathsworn book. It grabs the reader by the eyeballs and drags them headlong through the action. ... Crowbone maintains the power and the authenticity of the first four Oathsworn books, but throws in new elements and a fresh, 'headlong rush' feel. It is at the same time a wonderful continuation and a bright departure. It is simply a great read." Writer and editor Nick Rennison in the Sunday Times says, "Gore and guts fill the pages of Crowbone... but they're also filled with the kind of muscular, fast-moving prose that gives the story real depth and distinction."

See also
 Olaf Tryggvason — The historical person behind the character.
 Hnefatafl — The "Game of Kings" played in Crowbone.

References

External links
 
 The real Crowbone by Robert Low
 The game of Hnefatafl (nef-uh-ta-fal) — Author Robert Low explains the game that is played, and serves as a metaphor for strategies, in his novel Crowbone.

2012 British novels
Novels set in the Dark Ages
Scottish historical novels
Novels by Robert Low
HarperCollins books